Eternal Fragrance ("Last Sunday") is a book written by Masoumeh Ramhormozi about the Iran–Iraq war (1980–88). Masoumeh, who was 14 at the time, was a social worker in a field hospital during the war. The English translation of The Last Sunday, titled Eternal Fragrance, was launched at the 66th Frankfurt Book Fair.  This book discusses some of the roles of Iranian women who participated in the Iran-Iraq war. Eternal Fragrance was ranked the second book in the 9th Sacred Defense Book of the year awards.

According to critics, Eternal Fragrance is the most effective memoir of the Iran–Iraq war. It is one of the first published works about the Iranian women's roles during this period, which paved the way for the publication of similar works. The original book was translated into English by Farahnaz Omidvar.

Background 
Masoumeh Ramhormozi, a native of southern Iran, was 14 in 1980 when the Iran-Iraq war broke out.  She was raised in a religious family who were active during and after the Iranian Revolution. Masoumeh was a social worker in a field hospital. Her brothers were killed in the war and she has said that moment was the hardest of the war for her. Ramhormozi had a notebook that wrote her memoirs for her own peace of mind, and sometimes tore them up.

Narrative 
Eternal Fragrance is mainly about the memories of Masoumeh Ramhormozi, a woman fighter whose father and brothers were killed during the Iran-Iraq war. At the start of the book she states: "I wrote major event in note book everyday for peace of my heart and sometimes teared up my handwritten". She kept the notes and used them to write her memoirs and said, "I write [my] own memories today for reading with other people not for my heart". This book consists of 12 chapters, a pictures gallery, and documents about major events during Iran-Iraq war.

Publication 
The book was first published in Persian as The Last Sunday by Sureye Mehr Publication Company in 2003. The original book was translated into English by Farahnaz Omidvar, and the English translation was later sent to England for editing. The English version, titled, Eternal Fragrance, was launched at the 66th Frankfurt Book Fair.

See also 
Iran–Iraq War
Liberation of Khorramshahr
Battle of Khorramshahr
Mohammad Jahanara
Noureddin, Son of Iran
One Woman's War: Da (Mother)
Persepolis (banned in Iran)
List of Iranian commanders in the Iran–Iraq War
That Which That Orphan Saw
Chess with the doomsday machine
Fortune Told in Blood
Journey to Heading 270 Degrees
Baba Nazar (book)

References

External links 
 Introduction of Eternal Fragrance (Persian)

Iran–Iraq War memoirs
Women in warfare post-1945
Women in war in the Middle East
2003 non-fiction books
2014 non-fiction books
Iranian biographies
1980 in Iran
Iranian memoirs
History of women in Iran